Separu (also Romanized as Separū and Saparū; also known as Pākūh and Separ) is a village in Bafran Rural District, in the Central District of Nain County, Isfahan Province, Iran. At the 2006 census, its population was 84, in 38 families.

References 

Populated places in Nain County